Cambodian Mekong University (CMU) is a private university located in Phnom Penh, Cambodia. It is registered as a private higher education institution with the Ministry of Education, Youth and Sports. The university was established in 2003. The current chancellor is Mr.Ban Thero, a graduate of Southern Cross University and Adelaide University.

References

External links

Cambodia Mekong University

Universities in Cambodia
Education in Phnom Penh